Vessel in Orbit is an album by American jazz drummer Whit Dickey, Mat Maneri, and Matthew Shipp recorded in 2016 and released on the Aum Fidelity label. The recording presents a new trio with violist Mat Maneri and pianist Matthew Shipp, who were both part of the quartet, along with saxophonist Rob Brown, for 2001 Dickey's album Life Cycle.

Reception 

The Down Beat review by Bradley Bambarger states "Although one must be open to a certain exposed-nerve intensity to fully appreciate it, Vessel In Orbit has the air of an abstract drama, the three storyteller-improvisers utterly in sync."

Track listing 
All compositions by Dickey/Maneri/Shipp.
 "Spaceship 9" – 5:15
 "Space Walk" – 6:37
 "Dark Matter" – 5:58
 "Galaxy 9" – 9:13
 "Turbulence" – 4:51
 "To a Lost Comrade" – 5:39
 "Space Strut" – 4:29
 "Hyperspatial" – 6:12

Personnel 
Whit Dickey – drums
Mat Maneri – viola
Matthew Shipp – piano

References 

2017 albums
Whit Dickey albums
AUM Fidelity albums